The estrogen receptor test (ERT) uses the estrogen receptor (ER) tumor marker that allows for immunohistochemical techniques to be performed for diagnostic purposes. Immunohistochemistry (IHC) techniques involve the selective identification of antigen proteins by exploiting these antigen-antibody relationships to characterize your analyte of interest. Previously, the ligand binding assay has been used in the determination of ER activity, however, this method was limited because of the requirement of large quantities of fresh tissue needed for each assay. IHC serves as a more efficient method as this technique allows for the morphology of the tissue to be observed in a tumor-specific manner. This increases the practicability of this technique as in many cases, patients’ tissue samples are limited in the applications of biomarker analysis. Anti-estrogen receptor antibodies were among the first of biomarkers that introduced a semi-quantitative assessment of the ER activity. Today, ER analysis is one of many routinely performed immunohistochemical assays performed to classify the hormone receptor status and to serve as a means of insight into the determination of cancer prognosis and management.

Estrogen receptor test

The ER activity can be monitored using immunohistochemical methods in applications like tissue analysis for tumorigenesis. The activation of the ER through binding to the estrogen hormone stimulates the mammary cell division, catalyzing the cell division and DNA replication process. This results in exponential multiplication of replications of the mutated genes, along with large amounts of genotoxic waste in response to this estrogen metabolism pathway. These ill effects highly increase the chances of malignant cell formation, and in turn, increase the chance of tumor formation.

Estrogen receptor types

There are two main types of estrogen receptors: estrogen receptor alpha (ERα) also known as NR3B1, and estrogen receptor beta (ER-β) also known as NR3A2. Both of these are nuclear receptors activated by the sex hormone, estrogen, and encoded by the ESR1 (Estrogen Receptor 1) gene. The estrogen signaling can be stimulated or inhibited selectively. This is dependent upon the equilibrium of these 2 receptor types in target organs.  These two ER types are encoded by different genes located on separate chromosomes and have different functions. ERα is mostly active in the mammary gland and uterus, and aids in the regulation of skeletal homeostasis and metabolism.  ER-β on the other hand, plays a more prominent role in the central nervous and immune systems functional mechanisms.

Immunohistochemical assessment 

The ERT immunohistochemical assessment is a semi-quantitative method used to predict the likelihood of success to anti-estrogen therapy in breast carcinoma. ER-positive breast carcinomas are likely to respond to various endocrine treatments, causing the monitoring of ER activity an essential variable in disease and treatment progression. In 2002, 6 cases of breast carcinoma were received, characterized, and analyzed through the ERT IHC assessment. The level of known ER activity was classified (negative, low, medium, and high) and selected for observation. After embedment in a paraffin block, the samples were stained using a hematoxylin and eosin staining (H & E staining) system. The IHC analysis was then performed the same day using anti-ER monoclonal antibodies, and resulted in a consistently strong correlation in the carcinoma samples with ER activity, whereas the level of ER activity increased, the IHC response increased respectively.

Various target antibodies may be used in the IHC assessment of the ER. Typically, the antibody used for this experiment is the anti-estrogen Receptor (ER) (SP1) Rabbit Monoclonal Antibody. Employing SP1 allows for the detection of estrogen receptor (ER) antigens in sections of the fixed patient samples. In junction with light microscopy, the approximate ER activity can be estimated using the level of staining of the cell's components. The anti-ER (SP1) antibody targets the ER alpha protein (ERα) located in the nucleus of ER-positive normal and neoplastic cells. The anti-ER (SP1) antibody's response is a useful indication of the progression, management, and prediction of therapy outcome of breast cancer. These antibodies are commercially available from 3 commonly used auto strain vendors- Dako, Leica, and Ventana, and in a study by Kornaga et al, all behaved similarly in the semi-quantitative analysis of breast cancer biopsy samples.

Estrogen receptor pathway

Estrogen receptor pathway schematic 

The schematic below models the activity pathway of the estrogen receptor. In the typical estrogen pathway (i) estrogen or other selective estrogen receptor modulators (SERMs) are bound to the estrogen receptor (ER) via the coregulatory proteins (CoReg) in the nucleus.  Alternately, the estrogen or SERM complexes may occur through the ER located adjacent to the plasma membrane (ii) with the help of adaptor proteins such as caveolin 1 or SHC1, which target the ER complexes to the plasma membrane. Activation of the ER complex causes increased kinase activity in phosphoinositide 3-kinases (PI3K) and mitogen-activated protein kinase (MAPK) as well as increases in concentrations of signaling molecules like calcium and nitric oxide.

Estrogen receptor test and breast cancer

The main challenges of cancer diagnosis and treatments are because the symptoms of several cancers, including in cases of breast cancers are easily ignored, or incorrectly credited to other ailments. A weapon of attack for these cancers could be found in monitoring irregularities or changes in receptor functions. Predictive biomarker assays seem to be the golden standard for therapeutic interventions of today as they allow insight into the molecular environment and allow for species of interest to be quantified. The estrogen receptor (ER) is no exception to this concept as the observation of this receptor’s activity allows for insight into growth and proliferation and allows for differentiations to be made between various intercellular environments. Complex biochemical reactions exhibited by the estrogen receptor are necessary for the mediation of cellular interactions in response to various cell-altering factors including ligands, cofactors, and other simulative complexes.

Monitoring tumor development with the estrogen receptor test 

The estrogen receptor is the main regulator of cellular functions including cell growth, and proliferation, and can serve as a means of inter-cellular differentiation. Monitoring the activity of the ER via the ERT is necessary as it plays an essential role in normal breast development and function, as well as in cancerous situations. Accurate measurements of the ER activities are critical in the care and progression monitoring of breast cancers as the ER can serve as an indicative biomarker as it is a potential predictor for the clinical responses of a patient to cancer treatments. It has been proven that breast cancer patients who present an ER-positive status are most likely to respond to cancer treatments through endocrine therapy.  Measuring the ER activity is essential in the care of breast patients as the Estrogen receptor test allows for informed decisions to be made for the future best treatments for cancer patients.

Estrogen receptor test in mammary epithelial cancer 

In approximately 70% of diagnosed cases of breast cancers, the ER activity is over-expressed. Growing exposure of the mammary epithelium to estrogen is related to the risk of breast cancer as the binding of estrogen to the HER2 (cancerous breast cell receptor) in mammary cells causes a rise in the division and cell synthesis. This ultimately leads to a higher risk of replication errors, and the disruption of the normal cellular processes results in errors in apoptosis, cellular proliferation, or DNA repair.

The ERT has been suggested as a predictor for the level of success of the use of endocrine therapy in cancer treatment. Many of the endocrine therapies for breast cancer treatments involve the use of selective estrogen receptor modulators (SERMs). SERMs for example the drug tamoxifen, are ER antagonists in breast tissue. They are used in determining the sensitivity of breast cancer lesions to tamoxifen. Patients whose tumors are ER-positive are likely to respond well to these endocrine therapies.

References

External links 
 Estrogen receptor test entry in the public domain NCI Dictionary of Cancer Terms

Tumor markers